Safeer Ullah Khan (born April 7, 1985 in Peshawar) is a professional squash player who represented Pakistan. He reached a career-high world ranking of World No. 71 in February 2004.

References

External links
 
 

Pakistani male squash players
Living people
1985 births